The Pau-Rosa National Forest is a national forest in the state of Amazonas, Brazil.

Location

The Pau-Rosa National Forest is divided between the municipalities of Maués (98.63%) and Nova Olinda do Norte (1.37%) in Amazonas.
The national forest adjoins the Maués State Forest to the north, the Amazônia National Park to the east, the Amaná National Forest to the southeast and the Alto Maués Ecological Station to the southwest.
The Abacaxis River forms the western boundary of the southern section, and the Paraconi River forms the western boundary of the northern section.

Initial samples of the fauna have found 40 species of amphibians, 20 of reptiles and almost 270 of birds.
A new species of frog, Scinax sateremawe, was found in 2009 with an abundant population.

History

The Pau-Rosa National Forest was created by federal decree of 7 August 2001 with the objective of promoting management of multiple use of natural resources, maintenance and protection of biodiversity and water resources, recovery of degraded area, and environmental education, as well as support for sustainable development of natural resources.
The forest is administered by the Chico Mendes Institute for Biodiversity Conservation.
It is classed as IUCN protected area category VI (protected area with sustainable use of natural resources).

On 30 November 2009 the forest was recognized as supporting the needs of 300 families of small rural producers, who would be eligible for PRONAF support.
The advisory council was created of 24 May 2012.

Notes

Sources

National forests of Brazil
Protected areas of Amazonas (Brazilian state)
2001 establishments in Brazil
Protected areas established in 2001